is a private university in Zentsūji, Kagawa, Japan. The predecessor of the school was founded in 1949.

External links
 Official website 

Educational institutions established in 1949
Christian universities and colleges in Japan
Private universities and colleges in Japan
Universities and colleges in Kagawa Prefecture
1949 establishments in Japan
Zentsūji, Kagawa